Carlos Moyá was the defending champion, but lost in the semifinals to Félix Mantilla.

Mantilla won the title by defeating Sergi Bruguera 6–3, 7–5 in the final.

For the first time since the San Jose tournament in 1995, all four semifinalists were from the same nationality, this time representing Spain. This achievement would remain unequaled until 2003, when four Americans filled the semifinals at the Memphis tournament.

Seeds

Draw

Finals

Top half

Bottom half

References

External links
 Official results archive (ATP)
 Official results archive (ITF)

Croatia Open Umag - Singles
1997 Singles
1997 in Croatian tennis